Kenneth Cowan may refer to:

Sir Kenneth Cowan, Chief Medical Officer for Scotland, see Chief Medical Officer (United Kingdom)
 Ken Cowan, Canadian organist
 Ken Cowan (activist), Scottish AIDS activist